Jagaddeva may refer to:

 Jagaddeva (Paramara dynasty), 11th century prince from the Paramara dynasty of central India
 Jagaddeva (Chahamana dynasty), 12th century ruler from the Chahamana dynasty of north-western India